Stephen John Woodward (born 1947) is a New Zealand cricket umpire who stood in 24 Test matches and 30 ODIs.  

Born in New Zealand, his first Test match was the New Zealand v Pakistan test at Napier in 1979, while his last came in the New Zealand v Sri Lanka test at Wellington in 1991.  He also stood in 30 one day internationals and officiated in New Zealand domestic cricket.  Unusually for an umpire, he had no experience as a player at first class level.

See also
 List of Test cricket umpires
 List of One Day International cricket umpires

References

1947 births
Living people
New Zealand Test cricket umpires
New Zealand One Day International cricket umpires